Verbascum virgatum, commonly known as twiggy mullein and wand mullein, is a plant species in the family Scrophulariaceae.

Description
It is a tall-growing biennial herb reaching a height of between 1 and 2 metres. The flowers are 3 to 4 cm in diameter and are yellow with a purple centre.

Distribution
The species is native to Great Britain, Italy, France, the Iberian Peninsula, the Canary Islands and the Madeira Islands.

Additionally, it is naturalised in South Africa, North America, South America, Australia, New Zealand, Melanesia, Polynesia and the Azores.

References

External links
 Jepson Manual Treatment
 Photo gallery

virgatum
Flora of Europe
Flora of Italy
Flora of Spain
Flora of the Canary Islands
Flora of Madeira
Flora of the United Kingdom
Flora naturalised in Australia